The Rural Municipality of Reford No. 379 is a rural municipality (RM) in the Canadian province of Saskatchewan within Census Division No. 13 and  Division No. 6.

History 
The RM of Reford No. 379 incorporated as a rural municipality on December 12, 1910.

Geography

Communities and localities 
The following urban municipalities are surrounded by the RM.

Villages
 Landis

The following unincorporated communities are within the RM.

Localities
 Brass
 Cathkin
 Cavell (dissolved as a village, January 1, 1943)
 Leipzig (dissolved as a village, February 1, 1984)
 Reford
 St. Alphege
 Wolfe

Demographics 

Government 
The RM of Reford No. 379 is governed by an elected municipal council and an appointed administrator that meets on the second Thursday of every month. The reeve of the RM is Gerald Gerlinsky while its administrator is Sherry Huber. The RM's office is located in Wilkie.

Transportation 
 Saskatchewan Highway 14
 Saskatchewan Highway 656
 Saskatchewan Highway 657
 Saskatchewan Highway 659
 Saskatchewan Highway 784
 Canadian Pacific Railway
 Canadian National Railway
 Wilkie Airport

See also 
List of rural municipalities in Saskatchewan

References 

Reford

Division No. 13, Saskatchewan